Jack Rollins (born Jacob Rabinowitz; March 23, 1915 – June 18, 2015) was an American film and television producer and talent manager of comedians and television personalities. His first major success came in the 1950s when he managed actor and singer Harry Belafonte. Rollins co-wrote the song Man Piaba with Belafonte on his 1954 debut  RCA Victor album Mark Twain and other Folk Favorites. In 1958 he helped create and promote the comedy duo Nichols and May. He went on to help shepherd the careers of several prominent comedians with his partner Charles H. Joffe, beginning in 1960 with  Woody Allen and later with Dick Cavett, Billy Crystal, David Letterman, and Robin Williams.

Rollins' work as a film and television producer was closely tied to the artists that he managed. He was credited as an executive producer on many of the films directed by Woody Allen from 1969 to 2015. From 1970 to 1972 he was an executive producer on ABC's The Dick Cavett Show and, from 1982 to 1992, he was an executive producer of the NBC series Late Night with David Letterman. Between the two shows, he was nominated for a Primetime Emmy Award ten times.

Life and career
Born Jacob Rabinowitz in Brooklyn, Rollins was the son of Yiddish-speaking immigrants from Russia. In 1933, he graduated from Thomas Jefferson High School, and in 1937 earned a bachelor's degree from the City College of New York. He spent two years working for an orphanage in Chicago before being drafted into the United States Army during World War II.

Rollins worked as a decoder of communications in India during the war where one of his commanding officers was actor Melvyn Douglas. Rollins assisted Douglas in staging shows at the China–Burma–India theater and developed a friendship with him. After the war, Douglas assisted Rollins in developing the professional contacts he needed to begin working as a producer on Broadway.

Rollins' work as a Broadway producer during the late 1940s and early 1950s proved to be difficult and ultimately unfruitful. He abandoned this pursuit in 1951 when he established a one-man talent agency in Midtown Manhattan. He worked with the then-unknown Harry Belafonte. He later became partners with Charles H. Joffe and they successfully managed the careers of several artists, most of whom were comedians, among them Woody Allen, Dick Cavett, Billy Crystal, Robert Klein, David Letterman, Robin Williams, and the comedy duo Nichols and May. Joffe focused more on Allen, with Rollins focusing on others. He was approached in the early 1960s by legendary comedian Lenny Bruce concerning management and possible representation. According to Rollins' wife, Jane, Rollins declined due to Bruce's personal issues.

In his 2005 Cecil B. DeMille Award acceptance speech, Robin Williams referred to Jack Rollins as 'the most ethical man in show business'.

Rollins was producer for The David Letterman Show (1980) and Late Night with David Letterman from its inception in 1982 until 1992.

Rollins was a close friend of jazz pianist Bill Evans, with whom he owned a racehorse named 'Annie Hall'.  Rollins died on June 18, 2015.

Filmography

Executive Producer
 Film 

 Television

As an Actor

Awards and nominations

References

External links

1915 births
2015 deaths
American centenarians
Men centenarians
American film producers
Jewish American television producers
Jewish American film producers
American people of Russian-Jewish descent
Filmmakers who won the Best Film BAFTA Award
People from Brooklyn
Thomas Jefferson High School (Brooklyn) alumni
City College of New York alumni
Late Night with David Letterman
United States Army personnel
Signals Intelligence Service cryptographers
Mathematicians from New York (state)